Nemanja Aleksandrov (Serbian Cyrillic: Немања Александров, born April 10, 1987) is a Serbian professional basketball player. He also represented the Serbian national basketball team internationally. He is a 2.10 m (6 ft 11 in) tall power forward, but can play as a small forward

Professional career
After winning gold and MVP honors at the 2003 U16 European Championships and receiving "young athlete of the year" distinction in Serbia and Montenegro the same year, Aleksandrov was regarded as a future NBA player. He would have a solid pro career, but would not live up to the huge expectations that were placed upon him due to big injury problems with his knees.

He started his professional basketball career with FMP Železnik and stayed there until the summer of 2006. He then transferred to Crvena zvezda where he stayed for three seasons, before leaving in the summer of 2009. He signed with Union Olimpija the summer of 2009.

After just a year in Slovenia he left Union because of unpaid salary, so he signed a one-year contract with option to extend with the Italian team Scavolini Pesaro. He spent the whole 2011–12 season working individually with Nenad Trajković.

On August 12, 2012, Aleksandrov signed with the Belgian team Verviers-Pepinster. In March 2013, he left Pepinster and signed with the Spanish club Bàsquet Manresa for the rest of the season.

In July 2013, German team EWE Baskets Oldenburg announced that they had signed Aleksandrov for two years. On July 8, 2015, he signed a one-year extension with the club.

On October 13, 2016, Aleksandrov signed with the Turkish team Gaziantep Basketbol. On December 20, 2016, he returned to Germany, signing with Basketball-Bundesliga outfit Eisbären Bremerhaven for the rest of the 2016–17 season.

National team career
Aleksandrov played with the Serbian national basketball team at the EuroBasket 2007.

See also 
 List of Serbia men's national basketball team players

References

External links

 Nemanja Aleksandrov at draftexpress.com
 Nemanja Aleksandrov at eurobasket.com
 Nemanja Aleksandrov at euroleague.net
 Nemanja Aleksandrov at nbadraft.net
 

1987 births
Living people
ABA League players
Basketball League of Serbia players
Bàsquet Manresa players
Eisbären Bremerhaven players
EWE Baskets Oldenburg players
Gaziantep Basketbol players
Jászberényi KSE players
KK Crvena zvezda players
KK FMP (1991–2011) players
KK Olimpija players
Liga ACB players
Power forwards (basketball)
RBC Pepinster players
SCM U Craiova (basketball) players
Serbia men's national basketball team players
Serbian expatriate basketball people in Belgium
Serbian expatriate basketball people in Germany
Serbian expatriate basketball people in Italy
Serbian expatriate basketball people in Hungary
Serbian expatriate basketball people in Romania
Serbian expatriate basketball people in Slovenia
Serbian expatriate basketball people in Spain
Serbian expatriate basketball people in Turkey
Serbian men's basketball players
Small forwards
Basketball players from Belgrade
Victoria Libertas Pallacanestro players